The Tooele Valley Railway was a railroad  founded in 1908, and owned by the Anaconda Copper corporation. The line ran from a connection with the Union Pacific Railroad and the Western Pacific Railroad at Warner Station on the western edge of Tooele, Utah, to a terminus at the International Smelting and Refining Company smelter operations on the eastern edge of Tooele. The line was abandoned around 1982, nearly a decade after the smelter closure and the end of production at the nearby Carr Fork Mine.

The Tooele Station has been preserved to form the Tooele Valley Museum and Historic Park and has been registered on the National Register of Historic Places as the Tooele Valley Railroad Complex.

Description
The Tooele Valley Railway was founded in 1908, by the Utah Consolidated Mining Company  to connect the International Smelter to the Los Angeles and Salt Lake Railroad (later bought out by the Union Pacific Railroad). In 1917 the Western Pacific Railroad built a branch line to connect with the Tooele Valley Railway  The line ran from a connection with the mainline on the west end of Tooele, Utah, to the smelter located on the bench of the Oquirrh Mountains.

A large portion of the Tooele Valley Railway was a street running railroad, traveling through Vine Street until reaching Tooele Station. The grade traveled out of the city until crossing a wooden trestle at the mouth of Middle Canyon. In later years the trestle was filled in with rock overburden to stabilize it. The grade continued along the mountain bench until reaching the smelter. In 1937 a branch line was built connecting the line to the Elton Tunnel. The smelter closed in 1972, and the railroad lost its main revenue source. The railroad briefly served the Carr Fork Mine project during the late 1970s. Union Pacific Railroad's Warner depot which had served the interchange point between the Tooele Valley Railway and the UP, burned down in December 1975. The last revenue train ran on July 7, 1980. The line was abandoned by 1982. Reclamation of the grade was performed as part of the Superfund program.

Notable employees
Harry K. McClintock who worked as a Switchman in Salt Lake City, Utah in 1917, The Big Rock Candy Mountains

Locomotives
The Tooele Valley Railway owned several steam locomotives. During the majority of the steam era, the line owned four 2-8-0 locomotives, numbers #9 through #12. The line also operated an 0-6-0 locomotive #3, and a 2-6-0 locomotive #2. The majority of the line's steam locomotives were retired in 1955, when an EMD SW1200 locomotive #100 was purchased, later an EMD SW900 locomotive was purchased from Pickering Lumber Company in 1966, becoming locomotive #104. Locomotive #11 was kept as a back up for the diesel locomotive until 1963.

Preservation

Locomotive #11 and #12 were built as part of an order of 2-8-0's for the Buffalo and Susquehanna Railroad by the American Locomotive Company at their Brooks Locomotive Works in 1910.  Bankruptcy caused the Buffalo and Susquehanna to cancel the order, and ALCO kept the locomotives until selling them. #11 and #12 were sent to the Tooele Valley Railway in 1912. Locomotive #11 would be preserved after retirement in 1963. #12 was scrapped in 1956, with the tender being used to mount a snowplow. #11 would be the last steam locomotive in Utah to be used in revenue freight service. First displayed near the intersection of Vine Street and 200 West, #11 was moved to the Tooele Valley Railroad Museum in 1982 via rail. The museum also preserved the snowplow mounted to locomotive #12's tender, several pieces of Maintenance of way equipment, and a pair of caboose from the railway. Locomotive #100 and #104 were sold to new owners. It is also believed Ferrocarriles Nacionales de México #2501 a former Hines Construction company engine was likely used as Tooele Valley Railway #1 during the route's early years before it was transferred to Mexico, it is preserved in Monterrey, Mexico.

See also
 List of Utah railroads
 Anaconda Copper
 List of Superfund sites in Utah

References

Utah railroads